Giancarlo is an Italian given name meaning "John Charles". It is one of the most common masculine given names in Italy and is often short for "Giovanni Carlo". Notable people with the name include:

List

A
Giancarlo Agazzi (1933–1995), Italian ice hockey player
Giancarlo Alessandrelli (born 1952), Italian footballer
Giancarlo Alessandrini (born 1950), Italian comic artist
Giancarlo Alvarado (born 1978), Puerto Rican baseball player
Giancarlo Antognoni (born 1954), Italian footballer
Giancarlo Astrua (1927–2010), Italian road bicycle racer

B
Giancarlo Bacci (1931–2014), Italian footballer
Giancarlo Badessi (1928–2011), Italian actor
Giancarlo Baghetti (1934–1995), Italian Formula One driver
Giancarlo Bellini (born 1945), Italian road bicycle racer
Giancarlo Berardi (born 1949), Italian comic book writer
Giancarlo Bercellino (born 1941), Italian footballer
Giancarlo Bergamelli (born 1974), Italian alpine skier
Giancarlo Bergamini (1926–2020), Italian fencer
Giancarlo Bigazzi (1940–2012), Italian music producer
Giancarlo Boriani (1894–1962), Italian sports shooter
Giancarlo Brusati (1910–2001), Italian fencer

C
Giancarlo Cadé (1930–2013), Italian footballer and coach
Giancarlo Caltabiano (born 1967), Canadian actor
Giancarlo Camolese (born 1961), Italian footballer
Giancarlo Canavesio (born 1968), Italian film producer
Giancarlo Carloni (born 1947), Italian footballer
Giancarlo Carmona (born 1985), Peruvian footballer
Giancarlo Ceccarelli (born 1956), Italian footballer
Giancarlo Cella (born 1940), Italian footballer and coach
Giancarlo Centi (born 1959), Italian footballer and coach
Giancarlo Chiaramello (born 1939), Italian composer
Giancarlo Cobelli (1929–2012), Italian actor and stage director
Giancarlo Conta (born 1949), Italian politician
Giancarlo Coraggio (born 1940), Italian judge
Giancarlo Corradini (born 1961), Italian footballer and coach

D
Giancarlo da Silva Moro (born 1982), Brazilian footballer
Giancarlo Dametto (born 1959), Italian volleyball player
Giancarlo Danova (1938–2014), Italian footballer
Giancarlo de' Medici (1611–1663), Italian cardinal
Giancarlo De Carlo (1919–2015), Italian architect
Giancarlo De Sisti (born 1943), Italian footballer and coach
Giancarlo del Monaco (born 1943), Italian stage director

E
Giancarlo Esposito (born 1958), American actor

F
Giancarlo Falappa (born 1963), Italian motorcycle road racer
Giancarlo Ferrari (born 1942), Italian archer
Giancarlo Ferretti (born 1941), Italian road bicycle racer and team manager
Giancarlo Fisichella (born 1973), Italian Formula One driver
Giancarlo Flati (born 1953), Italian painter

G
Giancarlo Galan (born 1956), Italian politician
Giancarlo Gallifuoco (born 1994), Australian footballer
Giancarlo Genta (born 1948), Italian professor of machine design and construction
Giancarlo Gentilini (born 1929), Italian politician
Giancarlo Ghirardi (1935–2018), Italian physicist
Giancarlo Giammetti, Italian fashion entrepreneur
Giancarlo Giannini (born 1942), Italian actor
Giancarlo Giorgetti, Italian politician
Giancarlo González (born 1988), Costa Rican footballer
Giancarlo Gramolazzo (1945–2010), Italian priest and exorcist
Giancarlo Guerrini (born 1939), Italian water polo player
Giancarlo Guerrero, Costa Rican music director

I
Giancarlo Ibarguen (born 1963), Guatemalan businessman and academic
Giancarlo Improta (born 1987), Italian footballer

J
Giancarlo Judica Cordiglia (born 1971), Italian actor

L
Giancarlo Ligabue (1931–2015), Italian palaeontologist and politician
Giancarlo Livraghi (1927–2014), Italian author and advertising executive
Giancarlo Luzzani (1912–date of death unknown), Swiss field hockey player

M
Giancarlo Magalli (born 1947), Italian television writer and presenter
Giancarlo Maldonado (born 1982), Venezuelan footballer
Giancarlo Marinelli (1915–1987), Italian basketball player
Giancarlo Marocchi (born 1965), Italian footballer
Giancarlo Martini (1947–2013), Italian Formula One driver
Giancarlo Mazzanti (born 1963), Colombian architect
Giancarlo Meo, Italian record producer
Giancarlo Minardi (born 1947), Italian car racer and founder of the Formula One team Minardi
Giancarlo Monsalve (born 1982), Chilean tenor
Giancarlo Morolli, Italian philatelist
Giancarlo Morresi (1944–2019), Italian modern pentathlete

N
Giancarlo Neri (born 1955), Italian sculptor

P
Giancarlo Pagliarini (born 1942), Italian politician
Giancarlo Pajetta (1911–1990), Italian politician
Giancarlo Pallavicini (born 1931), Italian economist
Giancarlo Pantano (born 1977), Italian footballer
Giancarlo Parretti (born 1941), Italian financier
Giancarlo Pasinato (born 1956), Italian footballer and coach
Giancarlo Perini (born 1959), Italian road bicycle racer
Giancarlo Peris (born 1941), Italian track athlete
Giancarlo Petrazzuolo (born 1980), Italian tennis player
Giancarlo Polidori (born 1943), Italian road bicycle racer
Giancarlo Politi (born 1937), Italian art critic and publisher
Giancarlo Prete (1943–2001), Italian actor
Giancarlo Previato (born 1993), Brazilian footballer
Giancarlo Primo (1924–2005), Italian basketball player and coach

R
Giancarlo Rastelli (1934–1970), Italian cardiac surgeon
Giancarlo Rebizzi (born 1933), Italian footballer
Giancarlo Ronchetti (1913–unknown), Italian bobsledder
Gian-Carlo Rota (1932–1999), Italian born-American mathematician and philosopher

S
Giancarlo Santi (1939–2021), Italian director and screenwriter
Giancarlo Sbragia (1926–1994), Italian actor
Giancarlo Scottà (born 1953), Italian politician
Giancarlo Schiaffini, Italian jazz trombonist
Giancarlo Scottà (born 1953), Italian politician
Giancarlo Serenelli (born 1981), Venezuelan racing driver
Giancarlo Siani (1959–1985), Italian crime reporter
Giancarlo Snidaro (born 1954), Italian footballer
Giancarlo Stanton (born 1989), American baseball player

T
Giancarlo Tesini (born 1929), Italian politician

V
Giancarlo Venturini, Italian fashion designer and artist
Giancarlo Vilarinho (born 1992), Brazilian race car driver
Giancarlo Vitali (1926–2011), Italian footballer and manager
Giancarlo Vitali (painter) (1929–2018), Italian painter
Giancarlo Volpe (born 1974), American animator and director

W
Gian-Carlo Wick (1909–1992), Italian theoretical physicist

Z
Giancarlo Zagni (1926–2013), Italian director and screenwriter
Giancarlo Zolezzi (born 1981), Chilean swimmer

See also

John (first name)
Gian
Gian Carlo
Gian-Carlo
Giovanni (name)
Juan Carlos
Giancarla Trevisan

Italian masculine given names
Sammarinese given names